Since its creation as a town in the 18th century, the Politics of Dayton, Ohio have adapted to and reflected the changing needs of the community, from the Miami and Erie Canal through the World War II "Dayton Project" to the present day.

City Commissioners
The city government of Dayton, Ohio, is governed by a city commission comprising five commissioners, one of whom is the mayor. The commissioners serve staggered, four-year terms. Commissioners are elected two at a time in open, at-large, nonpartisan elections. The four top vote-getters in the primary election go on to compete in the general election, regardless of party membership. The top two vote-getters in the general election are elected. As of November 1969, the mayor is elected in a separate election. Although the elections are nominally nonpartisan, the Democratic and Republican parties nominate candidates.

Commission Seats 1 and 2

Commission Seats 3 and 4

1820 to 1828
From 1820 to 1828, Dayton was governed by a seven-member city council headed by a council president.

1829 to 1913

From 1829 to 1913, Dayton was governed by a seven-member city council headed by a mayor.

1914 to 1969

Starting in 1914, Dayton's government was changed to the "weak mayor" manager-council form. In this system, the five-member commission selects the city manager, who holds administrative authority over the municipal government. The mayor is simply one of the five members of the city commission. The mayor's only power over the other commissioners is as chairperson of the commission.

Bold type indicates mayor.

1970 to present

As of November 1969, the mayor is elected separately from the other four commissioners.

Election results
Bold type indicates winner.

General election

Primary election
The two candidates who run in the general election are chosen in this primary election. When fewer than three candidates file, no primary election is held.

Municipal Court Clerk
The clerk of the Dayton, Ohio, Municipal Court is elected for a four-year term.

Notes

Ohio
Dayton, Ohio-related lists
Government of Dayton, Ohio